La Minh Commune is a commune in Bar Kaev District in northeast Cambodia. It contains five villages and has a population of 2,622.

In the 2007 commune council elections, all five seats went to members of the Cambodian People's Party. Land alienation is a severe problem in Laming. (See Ratanakiri Province for background information on land alienation.)

Villages

References

Communes of Ratanakiri province